The 1996 season was the Buffalo Bills' 27th in the National Football League (NFL), their 37th overall (all of those under the ownership of Ralph Wilson) and their 10th full season under head coach Marv Levy. It was also the final season for long-time Bills quarterback Jim Kelly.

The team matched their previous season's record of 10–6 and qualified for the playoffs, for the second consecutive season and eighth time in nine seasons.

The Bills were upset at home in the wild card playoffs by the 9–7 Jacksonville Jaguars, 27–30 by a 45-yard field goal from future Bills kicker Mike Hollis, sealing the agonizing defeat.

Preseason

Draft

Mississippi State wide receiver Eric Moulds went on to be the second-leading receiver in Bills history (behind only Andre Reed), with 675 catches for 9,096 yards. He was elected to three Pro Bowls, in 1998, 2000 and 2002.

Personnel

Staff/coaches

Roster

Preseason

Schedule

Regular season

Schedule

Game summaries

Week 1

Week 2
The Bills upended the Patriots 17–10.  Quinn Early caught a 63-yard touchdown in the fourth quarter for Buffalo, then the Bills stopped the Patriots inside their five-yard line in the final seconds.

Week 3
The Bills' first Monday Night appearance ended in ugly fashion as the Steelers erupted to more rushing yards (222 with two touchdowns from ex-Ram Jerome Bettis) than the Bills had total yards of offense (185).  Carnell Lake picked off Jim Kelly and ran back a 47-yard score, part of a 24–6 Steelers win.

Week 4
The Bills hosted the defending Super Bowl champs who were 1–2 and fell to 1–3 as Buffalo rushed for 135 yards and a Thurman Thomas score while intercepting Troy Aikman three times; the last came in the final minute, and Aikman was tackled awkwardly by Bruce Smith, necessitating a Monday examination of his ankle. Jim Kelly was injured , as Todd Collins was the starting quarterback for Buffalo.

Week 5
Bye week

Week 6
The Bills hosted the Colts, the leagues last undefeated team. They clawed to a 10-3 lead in the second as Todd Collins (quarterback) threw his first NFL touchdown pass of his career.  Marshall Faulk's touchdown in the fourth tied the game; an exchange of field goals put the game into overtime tied 13-13 where Steve Christie won it from 39 yards out.

Vegas Line:	Buffalo Bills -3.5

Starting QBs:  Indianapolis Colts: Jim Harbaugh / Buffalo Bills: Todd Collins (quarterback)

Week 7
Craig Erickson started for Dan Marino and the Dolphins led 14–7 late in the fourth on scores by Irving Spikes and Karim Abdul-Jabbar.  Kelly completed a deep pass to Andre Reed and Reed was stopped at the 1-yard line by Terrell Buckley; the Dolphins held the Bills on the first three downs and Kelly was flagged for intentional grounding, forcing 4th and goal from the 11; Kelly's pass was picked off by Buckley at the 9 and Buckley ran back a 91-yard score.  Reacting to fan booing after the 21–7 loss, a disconsolate Kelly said, "We deserved to be booed."

Week 8
The Bills traveled to face the 0–7 New York Jets and kicker Steve Christie had a major workload as he booted five field goals to support a Darick Holmes score and to offset three touchdowns by ex-Bill Frank Reich (two to Keyshawn Johnson, one to Wayne Chrebet) and a two-point conversion to Kyle Brady.   Christie's sixth field goal finished off a 25–22 Bills win.

Week 9
On Sunday Night the Bills traveled to Foxboro Stadium and the ensuing game left them tied with the Patriots and Colts for the AFC East lead at 5–3.  After trailing 13–0 the Bills clawed back despite a safety given up on an endzone penalty against Jim Kelly; the Bills led 18–15 in the fourth.  With 1:25 to go Curtis Martin scored but Adam Vinatieri missed the PAT.  Kelly was then intercepted by Willie McGinest and McGinest ran back a 46-yard score, but the Bills on a 48-yard score to Andre Reed pulled to within 28–25 with 30 seconds left; the ensuing onside kick was recovered by ex-Dolphin recently signed by the Patriots Keith Byars.

Week 10
The Bills hosted the Washington Redskins and Darick Holmes had the game of his career as the Bills rushed for 266 yards (outgaining the entirety of the Skins offense by 28 yards) and five scores, four of them by Holmes.  The Bills reached 6–3 with the 38–13 win while the Skins' seven-game winning streak crashed to a halt.

Week 11
The Bills finished the NFC East portion of their schedule by upending the Eagles 24–17, thus sweeping the NFC East 4-0.  Despite being outgained in total yards (385 to 252) the Bills forced two Eagles fumbles and also scored on a blocked punt.

Starting QBs:  BUF=Jim Kelly vs  PHI=Ty Detmer

Head Coach: BUF=Marv Levy vs PHI=Ray Rhodes

Vegas Line=	Philadelphia Eagles -3.5

Week 12
The 4-6 Bengals came to Rich Stadium on a three-game winning streak after the firing of David Shula and promotion of Bruce Coslet to head coach.  The Bills didn't care as they rushed for 134 yards and touchdowns from Jim Kelly and Thurman Thomas; the Bills led 31-7 in the fourth as the Bengals scored ten points, but could get no further as Buffalo won 31-17.

Week 13
The Bills hosted the 1–11 Jets and erupted to a 28–3 lead by the fourth quarter; after a Frank Reich touchdown to Jeff Graham the Bills scored again on Eric Moulds' 97-yard kickoff return.  The 35–10 win left the Bills at 9–3 entering a three-game road trip.

Week 14
Starting a three-game road trip, the Bills traveled to Indianapolis where despite 307 yards of offense fell to the Colts 13-10 in overtime.  Todd Collins started and was intercepted twice as the Colts forced overtime and won on Cary Blanchard's 49-yard field goal. The Colts started backup QB Paul Justin for this game as well.

Week 15
The Bills traveled to the Kingdome where Seahawks kicker Todd Peterson booted four field goals while Kelly and Todd Collins combined for two touchdowns and three interceptions.  Buffalo's five turnovers were key as Rick Mirer won 26-18 despite only nine completions of 23 attempts.

Week 16
On Monday Night Football Buffalo's three-game road trip came up empty as the Bills fell to the Dolphins at Joe Robbie Stadium.  Joe Nedney booted three field goals and Dan Marino had one touchdown.  Jim Kelly had two scores but was picked off once. I was the first time the Bills had been swept by the Dolphins since 1986.

Week 17
The Bills hosted the Chiefs with both teams needing the win to make the playoffs.  Steve Bono was harassed all game long and held to just 138 yards with two picks.  Jim Kelly rallied the Bills from down 9-6 with two touchdowns.  The 20-9 win put the Bills into the playoffs as the AFC Wildcard home team while the Chiefs failed to reach the playoffs for the first time in the decade; it was Kansas City's fourth loss in the last five meetings with Buffalo.

Playoffs

The first-ever playoff game for the second-year Jaguars saw the game lead tie or change nine times.  Natrone Means rushed for 175 yards and a touchdown while Mark Brunell threw for 239 yards, a score, and two interceptions; in the fourth Jeff Burris ran back a 38-yard score off a Brunell pick.  The Jaguars rallied with two fourth-quarter scoring drives ending in a 45-yard field goal from future Bills kicker Mike Hollis.  The game turned out to be the last home playoff game for the Bills until the 2020 season and the last home playoff game loss for the Bills until the 2022 season.

Standings

References

Buffalo Bills seasons
Buffalo Bills
Buff